Income segregation is separation of various classes of people based on their income. For example, certain people cannot get into country clubs because of insufficient funds.

Income segregation is associated with greater inequality in education attainment between the classes.
Income segregation is highly correlated with income inequality, racial segregation and segregation of poverty and affluence. Also, the correlation of the income segregation between schools has been documented and an increasing trend occurred with little or no exception.

Income segregation is also dependent on the other variables which are observable within the society - the income inequality, spatial segregation of affluence and poverty (which describes the isolation of the upper- or low-income households and the other classes), or the racial segregation. Also, the inequality within the education system of the given class is associated to so extend with the income segregation.

The importance if the measuring income segregation is given by the different redistribution of outcomes across the society, uneven within different income classes. For the upper-income classes these differences can even be positive, often giving them better social and educational background or more pleasing environment in their metropolitan area. These neighborhoods can make themselves better off in comparison to the lower-income ones, mostly due to the given public policy (and the difference among the tax base each class pays). As a result, the income segregation even extends because no-one except these upper-income communities has and derive out of these advantages.

Metropolitan income segregation in the US grew constantly between the years 1970 to 2000, the fastest in the 1980s. The growth was stronger for the black families than for the white ones as well as the covariance of income inequality and the segregation of poverty and affluence.

Income segregation in context

Income segregation and income inequality 
Income inequality is a necessary condition for income segregation. If there were no income inequality, the neighborhoods would possess the same opportunities and conditions and thus no income segregation would probably occur.

Based on research, income inequality itself does not create income segregation – the presence of income-correlated residential preferences, and income-based housing market and/or housing policies is crucial indeed.

An increase in inequality in the US from 1970 to 1990 resulted in an increase in income segregation. Also, an increase in income segregation in economic school segregation is highly dependent on income inequality (also on the changes in the education policies played role).

Income segregation (as well as racial segregation) is stronger in the public educational system than in the private one, especially in the primary education, that being usually explained by again by the neighborhood (metropolitan area) where the school is located. Income segregation and income inequality's relationship is complex as its yielding result can be influenced by local political, economic, and a city's planning agenda which can either work for or against the fight with income segregation and income inequality.

Income inequality and the Segregation of Poverty and Affluence 
Income inequality affects income segregation. Among low-income households the difference between incomes do not significantly vary. Thus, income inequality is generally stronger among high-income households – i.e., upper- tail income inequality. In other words, there is little or no significant impact of the income inequality on income segregation among low-income households. It means that for moderate or high-income households it is more probable that they would not be able to afford to live in the same neighborhood (on the contrary to low-income households). Thus upper-tail income inequality leads to greater segregation of affluence and not necessarily to greater segregation of poverty.

Even though the segregation of the affluence is stronger, the research shows that it remains stable over the years (on the contrary to the other types).

Racial differences and income segregation 
Metropolitan income segregation also differs among races given by the racial discrimination in history, when fewer residential options were available for black households in comparison to the white household of the same income level and wealth, then the expansion in housing options in the late 20th century occurred. This resulted that the income inequality has a stronger correlation with income segregation among black families than among white families during this period, e. g. between the years 1970s and 1980s in the US, studies show that income segregation among black families grew more than three times faster than among white families.

Measurement  of the income segregation 
There are multiple options of measuring income segregation even though they are much less developed and each of them include some advantages as well as disadvantages. Many studies use dissimilarity index (unlike when measuring racial segregation) – whose possible disadvantage is the substantial loss of information. The variation of the dissimilarity index is the overall economic segregation index (OESI). This index is based on the seven variables based on the income, educational and occupational measures and out of these measures the overall economic segregation is calculated. Another possibility for measuring income segregation is the use of a ratio of the between-neighborhood variation in mean income to the total variation of income, one of the variation of this approach is a CGI - centile gap index (segregation is equal to one minus the ratio of the within-neighborhood variation in income percentile rank to the overall variation in percentile rank), Bourguignon's income inequality index or Jargowsky's Neighborhoods Sorting Index (NSI) – i.e. to the square root of the ratio of the between-unit income variance to the total income variance.

Rank-order theory index (HR) equals to the ratio of within-unit income rank variation to overall income rank variation. This approach allows to measure this type of segregation even if the precise threshold of the income is unknown and we choose only based on the percentiles.

RISI – Residential Income Segregation Index is one of the more precise measuring methods for summarizing the income segregation. As the name indicates, it focuses on the income segregation given by the residential possibilities.

The spacial ordering index  is based on the concept of spacial ordering and measurements derived from it. It is a way of describing and comparing different income levels in a given neighborhood with its physical location. This should provide a map and reveal some relationships between certain locations and income levels. there are several ways to approach spacial ordering, such as the "Nearest Neighbor Spatial Ordering", or the "Monocentric Spatial Ordering". Dawkins proposes his way of calculating the Spatial Ordering Index, originally derived as a ratio between the spatial Gini index  and the income segregation Gini index. Dawkins proposes a new method of substituting these two coefficients by two "Covariance based formulas" based on parameters, such as different types of Aggregate household income of a neighborhood and region, average rank and spatial rank of income of a given neighborhood.

Some of these approaches require the measurement of income inequality first for which the Gini index (Gini coefficient) is most widely use. If the value of the index is equal 0, perfect equality occurs. On the contrary, when the value if the index is equal to 1, perfect inequality is observed within the society.

Income segregation in the US 
Income segregation in the US is a direct result of rising income inequality since the 1970s, where today the difference in income of a 90th percentile family is nearly 10 fold from a family of 10th percentile in income distribution, as opposed to 6 fold difference in 1970. One of the manifestations of this phenomenon is an increase in residential income segregation, where in 1970, 66% of families lived in middle-class neighborhoods and by 2007, that number decreased to 43%. The rapid disappearance of middle-class neighborhoods is one of the indicators that middle-class itself is disappearing as well.

Why is the income segregation important to observe 
Income segregation is an important characteristic of the community indicating possible differences among the households of different level of income. High-income classes usually possess more cultural, educational, and political benefits. Thus, a child born in a low-income family is probable to make less than the one born in high-income household.

Some proposals have been made to help to reduce the income segregation, which is in the US even stronger than in the other developed countries, such as the integration of disadvantaged families into the mixed-income communities. This could to some way, according to the experts, help to reduce the poverty across the generations in these disadvantaged households.

The economic crisis between the years 2007-2011 also had an impact on the trend of economic segregation on which precise research have not been made yet.

See also 
 Classism
 Poor door
 Exclusionary zoning

References 

Class discrimination
Housing